People's Republic of China competed at the 2013 Summer Universiade in Kazan, Russia from 6 July to 17 July 2013. 294 athletes are a part of the Chinese team.

China has won 77 medals (common with Ukraine 3rd place after Russia and Japan), including 26 gold medals (2nd place after Russia).

References

Nations at the 2013 Summer Universiade
China at the Summer Universiade